Pat O'Hara Wood and Suzanne Lenglen were the defending champions, but O'Hara Wood did not compete. Lenglen partnered with Jean Washer, but lost in the semi-finals to 
eventual champions Randolph Lycett and Elizabeth Ryan.

Lycett and Ryan defeated Lewis Deane and Dorothy Shepherd-Barron in the final, 6–4, 7–5 to win the mixed doubles tennis title at the 1923 Wimbledon Championships.

Draw

Finals

Top half

Section 1

The nationality of Mrs D Harvey is unknown.

Section 2

Bottom half

Section 3

Section 4

The nationality of Mrs Herriot is unknown.

References

External links

X=Mixed Doubles
Wimbledon Championship by year – Mixed doubles